Mithila Solar PV Station is a 10 MW solar station located at Dhanusha District, Province No. 2; Nepal.  The plant is owned and run by Eco Power Development Pvt. Ltd., an IPP. The plant came in operation in February 2021.

The station occupies an area of about 40 Bighas of land (approx. 26.5 hector). The station has 28,504 solar panels and three inverters to convert 660 DC to AC.  The energy generated by the project is connected to the Dhalkebar substation.  The generated electricity is sold to Nepal Electricity Authority at the rate of NPR 7.30 per kWh.

See also
List of power stations in Nepal
Butwal Solar PV Project
Nuwakot Solar Power Station
Mithila 2 Solar PV Station

References

Energy in Nepal
Renewable energy in Nepal
Solar power in Nepal
Solar power stations in Nepal
Electric power in Nepal
Buildings and structures in Dhanusha District